The Fifth Corps Area was a military district of the United States Army from 1920-21 to the Second World War. The Fifth Corps Area included the states of Indiana, Ohio, West Virginia, and Kentucky. Eventually it became Fifth Service Command on 22 July 1942, and then Fifth Service Command was disestablished in 1946.

Fifth Corps Area was established on 20 August 1920 with headquarters at Fort Benjamin Harrison, Indiana, and organized from parts of the discontinued Central Department. The headquarters was transferred to Fort Hayes, Columbus, Ohio, on 20 June 1922. 

The headquarters was responsible for the units of the Second and Fifth Armies, the V Army Corps (5th, 37th, and 38th Divisions) and XV Army Corps (83rd, 84th, 100th Infantry Divisions), select General Headquarters (GHQ) Reserve units, and Zone of the Interior support units of the Fifth Corps Area Support Command. 

In 1925 Air Service elements included the Air Service Officer, Fort Benjamin Harrison, Indiana; the Divisional Air Service, 5th Division with the 88th Observation Squadron at Wilbur Wright Field, Ohio (Major Hugh J. Knerr), and the associated 7th Photo Section.

Mobile units of the corps area, less GHQ Reserve and Z.I. units, were assigned to the Second and Fifth Armies from 1921 to 1933. With the adoption of the four field army plan on 1 October 1933, the units of the Fifth Corps Area were reassigned to the Second Army, GHQ Reserve, or demobilized.

Headquarters Company, V Corps was withdrawn from the Organized Reserve on 1 October 1933 and allotted to the Regular Army. At the same time, the Corps HQ was partially activated at Fort Hayes, OH, with Regular personnel from HQ, Fifth Corps Area, and Reserve personnel from the corps area at large. Though an Regular Army, Inactive, unit from 1927 to 1940, the Corps HQ was organized provisionally for short periods using its assigned Reserve officers and staff officers from HQ, Fifth Corps Area. These periods of provisional Active Duty were generally for command post exercises and major maneuvers. HQ, V Corps was fully activated on 20 October 1940, less Reserve personnel, at Camp Beauregard, LA, and thus passed outside the Fifth Corps Area.

The Fifth Corps Area Training Center was established in 1921, originally at Camp Knox, KY (redesignated Fort Knox in 1932), to train R.A. and O.R. units of all arms and services, as well as ROTC cadets and CMTC candidates. With the inactivation of the Fifth Corps Area Training Center in October 1922, Camp Knox became the primary training center for corps area infantry, cavalry, and field artillery units. 

When the V Corps was inactivated on 15 November 1924, a Headquarters, Non-Divisional Group, was established to direct the organization, training, and administration of all nondivisional units. The HQ, Artillery Group was established on 5 September 1925
at Cincinnati, OH, to direct the organization, training, and administration of all nondivisional field artillery and coast
artillery antiaircraft units. The corps area was further reorganized into four “military areas” on 28 September 1932. At that time, the Ohio Mil. Area assumed control of the 83d Div. area, the Indiana Mil. Area assumed control of the 84th Div. area, the West Virginia Mil. Area assumed control of the 100th Div. area less Kentucky, and the Kentucky Mil. Area assumed control of Kentucky elements of XV Corps, 100th Division, and the 64th Cavalry Division.

..HQ, Fifth Corps Area actually began functioning as a service command headquarters in October 1940 and was redesignated HQ, Fifth CASC in May 1941. It was further redesignated HQ, Fifth Service Command on 22 July 1942.

Commanders 1920−1934 
Maj. Gen. George W. Read 20 August 1920–29 August 1922 
Brig. Gen. Dwight E. Aultman 29 August 1922–4 October 1922 
Maj. Gen. James H. McRae 4 October 1922–7 February 1924 
Brig. Gen. Dwight E. Aultman 8 February 1924–12 July 1924 (second appointment)
Maj. Gen. Omar Bundy 12 July 1924–17 June 1925
Brig. Gen. Dwight E. Aultman 17 June 1925–16 July 1925 (third appointment)
Maj. Gen. Robert L. Howze 16 July 1925–19 September 1926 
Brig. Gen. Dwight E. Aultman 19 September 1926–10 June 1927 (fourth appointment)
Maj. Gen. Dennis E. Nolan 10 June 1927–30 November 1931
Maj. Gen. Hugh A. Drum 3 December 1931–22 February 1933
Brig. Gen. George H. Jamerson 22 February 1933–23 March 1933
Maj. Gen. George V. H. Moseley 26 March 1933–12 January 1934

The final commander was then Lieutenant General Daniel Van Voorhis in 1941-42.
Source:

References

 5
Military units and formations established in the 1920s
Military units and formations disestablished in 1941